Maple Valley Schools (Vermontville-Maple Valley) is located in Vermontville, Eaton County, Michigan. Maple Valley Schools is within the Eaton Intermediate School District.

District Boundaries
Maple Valley Schools consists of, (in Eaton County), Village of Vermontville, Vermontville Township and portions of the following townships: Sunfield Township, Kalamo Township, Chester Township, and Carmel Township, and (in Barry County), Village of Nashville, and portions of the following townships:  Castleton Township, Hastings Charter Township, Maple Grove Township, Baltimore Township, and Assyria Township.

References

External links
 Maple Valley Schools Official website - new]
 Maple Valley Schools Official website - old
 Maple Valley Schools District Map
 MVAA (Maple Valley Alumni Association) official website

School districts in Michigan
School districts established in 1963
Education in Eaton County, Michigan
1963 establishments in Michigan